The 1913–14 Massachusetts Agricultural College Aggies men's ice hockey season was the 6th season of play for the program.

Season
Mass Ag continued to dominate the smaller colleges of ice hockey. The Aggies allowed just one goal in six games while scoring thirty seven themselves. The team's two losses came against Ivy League competition but the Aggies acquitted themselves well in both.

Roster

Standings

Schedule and Results

|-
!colspan=12 style=";" | Regular Season

References

UMass Minutemen ice hockey seasons
Massachusetts Agricultural College
Massachusetts Agricultural College
Massachusetts Agricultural College
Massachusetts Agricultural College